Edgar Nicaise Constant Salli (born 17 August 1992), commonly known as Edgar Salli, is a Cameroonian footballer who currently plays as a winger for Olympiakos Nicosia and the Cameroon national team. He has previously played for Monaco and Coton Sport.

Club career

Early career in Cameroon
Salli began his career with central Cameroonian club Ngaoundéré FC and made his senior debut in Elite Two during the 2008–09 season. Ngaoundéré were relegated at the end of the campaign, and Salli joined Elite One side Coton Sport ahead of the 2009–10 season. His first campaign with the club was successful as Coton Sport were crowned champions of Cameroon for the tenth time, and Salli established himself in the Cameroon under-20 team. He continued to feature prominently for the club during the next campaign and his performances at the 2011 African Youth Championship saw him receive several offers from Europe. In May 2011, Salli was linked with a transfer to South African side Moroka Swallows with Kick Off reporting that he had a pre-contract agreement with them, but a transfer never materialised.

Monaco and loans
Having retained the Elite One championship with Coton Sport, he was transferred to Monaco in July 2011 for an undisclosed fee. He signed a three-year contract with the club, who had been relegated to Ligue 2 at the end of the 2010–11 season. Salli made his debut for Monaco in a 0–0 draw with Boulogne on 1 August, and scored his first goal for the club three weeks later in a one-all draw with Amiens. Salli scored his fifth goal of the season in league and cup competition on 2 March 2012 in a 2–2 draw with Sedan. He finished the season with five goals in 31 appearances. Salli played regularly for the reserves in the Championnat de France amateur the following season and made one appearance for the first team as the club won promotion back to Ligue 1 as champions.

On 23 July 2013, Salli joined RC Lens on a season-long loan from Monaco.

On 22 August 2014, he was once again loaned, this time to Académica.

Salli was again loaned out for the 2015–16 season to St. Gallen in the Swiss Super League.

1. FC Nürnberg
On 21 July 2016, it was announced that Salli would be joining forces of the German 2. Bundesliga team 1. FC Nürnberg.

Sepsi OSK Sfântu Gheorghe
On 29 July 2019, Salli signed two-year contract with Liga I side Sepsi OSK Sfântu Gheorghe.

International career
Prior to receiving his first cap for the Cameroon national team, Salli represented his country at youth international level. He made his debut for the under-20 team in 2009 and played regularly over the next two years. He took part in the 2010 CEMAC Cup and was voted player of the tournament at the 2011 African Youth Championship. Cameroon finished as runners-up in both competitions. Salli made his senior debut for Cameroon in a 1–1 draw with Equatorial Guinea on 11 October 2011. He took part in the 2011 LG Cup in November, an exhibition tournament held in Morocco, which Cameroon won. He scored his first goal for Cameroon against Moldova on 7 June 2014. Salli scored Cameroon's winner in an AFCON qualification win over Mauritania in June 2016.

International goals
As of match played 6 September 2016. Cameroon score listed first, score column indicates score after each Salli goal.

Honours
Cameroon
Africa Cup of Nations: 2017

References

External links

1992 births
Cameroonian footballers
Cameroon international footballers
Cameroonian expatriate footballers
Living people
People from Garoua
Association football wingers
Coton Sport FC de Garoua players
AS Monaco FC players
RC Lens players
Associação Académica de Coimbra – O.A.F. players
FC St. Gallen players
1. FC Nürnberg players
Sepsi OSK Sfântu Gheorghe players
Olympiakos Nicosia players
Ligue 2 players
Primeira Liga players
Swiss Super League players
2. Bundesliga players
Bundesliga players
Liga I players
Cameroon under-20 international footballers
2014 FIFA World Cup players
2015 Africa Cup of Nations players
2017 Africa Cup of Nations players
Expatriate footballers in Monaco
Expatriate footballers in France
Expatriate footballers in Portugal
Expatriate footballers in Germany
Expatriate footballers in Romania
Cameroonian expatriate sportspeople in France
Cameroonian expatriate sportspeople in Germany
Cameroonian expatriate sportspeople in Portugal
Cameroonian expatriate sportspeople in Romania
Cypriot First Division players